Henry Alexander Melvin (September 28, 1865 – April 24, 1920) was an associate justice of the Supreme Court of California from September 28, 1908 to December 1920.

Biography
Melvin was born at Springfield, Illinois, on September 28, 1865, to Samuel and Sarah Melvin, the youngest of four children. In 1874, when he was nine years old, his family moved from Illinois to St. Helena, California. In 1878, his parents moved to Oakland where his father, a retired medical practitioner, opened a pharmacy. Henry attended the University of California, Berkeley, while assisting his father to earn his school fees, graduating with a B.Phil. in 1889. In April 1890, he was elected census marshal by the Oakland Board of Education.

Melvin then enrolled in Hastings College of Law, receiving his LL.B. degree in 1892. While a student, he was elected and served as the Justice of the Peace of Brooklyn Township in Alameda County.

In 1893, Melvin became the assistant District Attorney of Alameda County. The next year in 1894, he accepted a five-year term to serve as Prosecuting Attorney for the City of Oakland. He returned to Alameda County to serve as Chief Deputy District Attorney, except for a period of three months when he was acting Deputy Attorney General of California.

In 1901, Melvin accepted the position of Superior Court Judge of Alameda county. In November 1902, he was elected to a full term. In 1904, the Legislature approved creation of the Courts of Appeal and Melvin was considered for one of the seats in the Second District but not chosen by Governor George Pardee.

In September 1908, Melvin was nominated by the Republican Party and appointed by Governor James Gillett as an associate justice of the Supreme Court of California. He succeeded Thomas B. McFarland, who had died in office. In November 1910, Melvin was re-elected at expiration of McFarland's term to a 12-year term.  On April 24, 1920, Melvin died while in office. In May 1920, his seat on the court was filled by appointment of William A. Sloane by Governor William Stephens for the term ending January 1923.

Clubs
Melvin was a member of the Bohemian Club. He was also a member of the Elks, and a bass singer who performed in church and club events.

Personal life
On June 14, 1893, he married Sarah Louise Morse of Portland, Oregon. He was survived by a son.

See also
 List of justices of the Supreme Court of California

References

External links
 Henry A. Melvin. California Supreme Court Historical Society. Retrieved July 18, 2017.
 Past & Present Justices. California State Courts. Retrieved July 19, 2017.

Justices of the Supreme Court of California
1865 births
1920 deaths
People from Springfield, Illinois
Lawyers from Oakland, California
University of California, Berkeley alumni
University of California, Hastings College of the Law alumni
Superior court judges in the United States
20th-century American judges
20th-century American lawyers
California state court judges
American jurists
American politicians who committed suicide
California Republicans
19th-century American lawyers